Sweet Smoke Live  is the third release from the progressive jazz rock band Sweet Smoke.  Released in 1974 it was their second record to feature only two tracks, the first being their debut effort Just a Poke.  It showcases the band's live talents with extended jamming, the guitar solos are the showcase. It was recorded live in Berlin, Musikhochschule. The last track is actually two songs that were combined during the LP engineering. The tracks were later listed separately when three additional tracks were added to the 2001 CD re-release. After the 1997 CD re-issue had already used a different cover than the original LP, the cover for the 2001 re-release was changed again, re-using the typographical design of the LP cover.

Track listing

1974 LP release and 1997 CD re-issue

Side one
 "First Jam" (Sweet Smoke) – 19:15

Side two
 "Shadout Mapes" (Rick Greenberg) "Ocean of Fears" (Marvin Kaminowitz) – 18:02

2001 CD re-release with bonus tracks
 "First Jam"
 "Shadout Mapes"
 "Ocean of Fears"
 "People Are Hard"
 "Schyler's Song"	
 "Final Jam"

Personnel
 Marvin Kaminowitz – lead guitar, vocals, percussion
 Rick Greenberg (aka, Rick Rasa) – rhythm guitar, sitar
 John Classi – percussion, sound effects
 Andrew Dershin – bass guitar, percussion
 Jay Dorfman – drums, percussion
 Martin Rosenberg – tambura, percussion

References

External links
Sweet Smoke Live at The South African Rock Encyclopedia

Reviews at www.progarchives.com

Sweet Smoke albums
1974 live albums